Amelia "Chiquita" Barreto Burgos (born 1947) is a Paraguayan writer. She is currently a professor at the Universidad del Norte in Paraguay and often works with the Union of Women for Mutual Help in Coronel Oviedo and student theatre productions.

Biography
Chiquita Barreto Burgos was born in 1947 in the Paraguayan town of Caaguazú. At some point, she graduated from the Faculty of Pedagogy of the Catholic University of Paraguay.

On 11 December 2015, she received the Roque Ganoa Literary Prize and six million Guaraní for her novel Los nombres que habito from the Society of Writers of Paraguay and Ganoa family. On 5 April 2017, Barreto presented the new book ¿Dónde van los gatos cuando llueve? and again on 17 July with the novel Tiempo y Destiempo.

Citations

References

External links
  Obras de Barreto Burgos, Chiquita

Living people
1947 births
Paraguayan women novelists
21st-century novelists
People from Caaguazú Department
21st-century Paraguayan writers
21st-century Paraguayan women writers